Joseph J. Unga (born January 5, 1987) is an American football offensive guard who is currently a free agent. He played college football at Mt. San Antonio College and Midwestern State. He is the brother of former New York Giants linebacker Uani 'Unga and cousin of former running back Harvey Unga.

College career

Mt. San Antonio College
He was selected to the California Community College Football Coaches' Association All-Region III first-team in his Sophomore season while playing for the Mt. SAC Mounties (Walnut, CA). He was selected to the JCFootball.com SoCal all-combine team also in his Sophomore season.

Midwestern State
He was selected to the third-team Beyond Sports Network All-America team after gaining first-team All-Lone Star Conference accolades in his senior season.

Professional career

Baltimore Ravens
On April 27, 2013, he signed with the Baltimore Ravens as an undrafted free agent.

Buffalo Bills
November 20, 2013, Unga was signed off of the Ravens practice squad after the Buffalo Bills released CB Justin Rogers. The Bills released Unga on August 25, 2014.

Arizona Rattlers
In November 2014, Unga was assigned to the Arizona Rattlers of the Arena Football League (AFL). On December 23, 2014, Unga was placed on the other league exempt list. On November 11, 2015, the Rattlers placed Unga on recallable reassignment.

Return to Baltimore
In December 2014, Unga re-signed with the Ravens to their practice squad.

Los Angeles KISS
On November 20, 2015, Unga was assigned to the Los Angeles KISS.

Tampa Bay Storm
On October 14, 2016, Unga was selected by the Tampa Bay Storm during the dispersal draft. He was placed on recallable reassignment on March 22, 2017.

Personal life
His older brother Paul Unga was the defensive end at Arizona State in 2008-09. He also has twin brothers named Feti and Uani Unga. He is the cousin of former Philadelphia Eagles running back and return specialist Reno Mahe, who was named to the 2005 All-Pro team. His other cousin is Naufahu Tahi, who also played in the National Football League where he was a fullback. He played only for the Minnesota Vikings from 2006-2010.

References

External links

1987 births
Living people
American people of Tongan descent
American football offensive tackles
American football offensive guards
Mt. SAC Mounties football players
Midwestern State Mustangs football players
Baltimore Ravens players
Buffalo Bills players
Arizona Rattlers players
Los Angeles Kiss players
Players of American football from California
Tampa Bay Storm players